David Littman may refer to:

 David Littman (activist) (1933–2012), British human rights activist
 David Littman (ice hockey) (born 1967), American ice hockey goaltender

See also
 David Litman (born 1957), American technology chief executive
 David Littmann (1906–1981), American cardiologist